The Eruption of Mount St. Helens! is a 1980 American short documentary film directed by George Casey.

Accolades
It was nominated for an Academy Award for Best Documentary Short at the 53rd Academy Awards a year later. It was the first 15/70  film to be nominated with such an honor.

Home media
It was released on DVD by SlingShot Entertainment May 23, 2000.

See also
 1980 eruption of Mount St. Helens

References

External links

Internet Archive
Official trailer

1980 films
1980 documentary films
1980 short films
American documentary films
1980s short documentary films
IMAX short films
Films scored by Michael Stearns
Films shot in Washington (state)
Mount St. Helens
IMAX documentary films
Documentary films about volcanoes
1980s English-language films
1980s American films